Maramuni Rural LLG is a local-level government (LLG) of Enga Province, Papua New Guinea.

Wards
01. Biak
02. Net Nai
03. Pasalaugus
04. Wailep
05. Tongori
06. Kaematok
07. Wangalongen
08. Neliyakou
09. Ilya
10. Poreak
11. Warakom
12. Pokale
13. Penale

References

Local-level governments of Enga Province